Saints Digna and Emerita (died 259 AD) are venerated as saints by the Catholic Church.  They were Roman maidens seized and put to the torture as Christians in the persecution of Valerian (A.D. 254-A.D. 259) at Rome.

Their feast day is celebrated on September 22.

Their relics are said to lie at the church of San Marcello al Corso, in Rome, although it is recorded that on April 5, 838, a monk named Felix appeared at Fulda with the remains of Saints Cornelius, Callistus, Agapitus, Georgius, Vincentius, Maximus, Cecilia, Eugenia, Digna, Emerita, and Columbana.

Notes

External links
Catholic Online: Digna and Emerita

259 deaths
3rd-century Christian martyrs
Groups of Christian martyrs of the Roman era
Year of birth unknown